Kelly Terry (born June 6, 1992) is a former women's ice hockey player for the Minnesota Golden Gophers. She made her debut with the Canada women's national ice hockey team at the 2014 4 Nations Cup.

Playing career

NCAA
She joined the Minnesota Golden Gophers in autumn 2010. She accumulated thirty-nine points, while appearing in 38 contests.

Hockey Canada
Terry was part of Canada’s National Women’s Under-18 Team gold medal winning squad at the 2010 IIHF World Women’s Under-18 Championship in Chicago. As a member of the gold medal winning squad, a hockey card of her was featured in the Upper Deck 2010 World of Sports card series. In addition, she participated in the Canada Celebrates Event on June 30 in Edmonton, Alberta which recognized the Canadian Olympic and World hockey champions from the 2009-10 season .

She was a member of Canada’s National Women’s Development Team that won a gold medal at the 2015 Nations Cup (formerly known as the Meco Cup).

Career stats

CWHL

Awards and honours
2009 Toronto Star's high school girls all-stars
2010-11 WCHA All-Rookie Team

Personal
Her father, Bill Terry played collegiately at Michigan Tech. In addition, he played five games with the Minnesota North Stars during the 1987-88 season

References

1992 births
Canadian women's ice hockey forwards
Living people
Minnesota Golden Gophers women's ice hockey players
Ice hockey people from Toronto